The 1943 Yale Bulldogs football team represented Yale University in the 1943 college football season.  The Bulldogs were led by second-year head coach Howard Odell, played their home games at the Yale Bowl and finished the season with a 4–5 record.

Schedule

References

Yale
Yale Bulldogs football seasons
Yale Bulldogs football